Blackmark is a paperback book (Bantam S5871) published by the American company  Bantam Books in January 1971. It is one of the first American graphic novels, predating  works such as  Richard Corben's Bloodstar (1976), Jim Steranko's Chandler: Red Tide (1976), Don McGregor and Paul Gulacy's Sabre (Sept. 1978), and Will Eisner's A Contract with God (Oct. 1978). It was conceived and drawn by comic book artist Gil Kane, and scripted by Archie Goodwin from an outline by Kane.

The term "graphic novel", while seen in print as early as 1964 in an obscure fan publication, was not in mainstream use in 1971 when Blackmark, a science fiction/sword-and-sorcery adventure, was first published; the back-cover blurb of the 30th-anniversary edition published in 2002 calls the book, retroactively, "the very first American graphic novel." 

A 119-page story of comic-book art, with captions and word balloons, published in a traditional book format, Blackmark is the first graphic novel with an original heroic-adventure character conceived expressly for this form. It originally sold for 75 cents, comparable to other paperbacks at the time.

Publication history

Gil Kane — an established comics artist who helped usher in the Silver Age of comic books with his part in revamping the DC Comics characters Green Lantern and the Atom, and who drew The Amazing Spider-Man during a historically notable 1970s run — had experimented with the graphic novel form with his 1968 black-and-white comics magazine His Name is... Savage, a 40-page espionage thriller scripted by Archie Goodwin from an outline by Kane.

According to Kane in a 1996 interview, Bantam Books CEO Oscar Dystel had personally taken Kane's pitch after Kane's attorney had secured him an appointment through a mutual friend of the attorney's and Dystel's. Kane went on to say Bantam contracted for four books, and increased the order to eight after Dystel saw and liked the completed pages of the first. Kane said Bantam paid him $3,500 for 120 pages (including the cover) all written, drawn and lettered in "camera-ready" form, i.e., in completed form suitable to go immediately to the printing press. Kane recalled having to draw "30 pages in one week. Then I'd have to knock off for a week or two to make some additional money" drawing comic-book stories and, mainly, covers.

Goodwin recalled that he came in at "the 11th hour":

The 2002 reissue, in its afterword, credits cartoonist and Mad magazine founder Harvey Kurtzman as laying out a small number of pages, and another major comics artist, Neal Adams, as inking some of Kane's pencil work, both doing so as a favor to help Kane meet his deadlines. Adams' own website, however, states that Adams did not ink but rather "penciled pages 80/81/82/92/98-107 / (total of 14pgs.)" and "Neal penciled 14 pages with Gil Kane inks (pages 80,81,82,92,98-107)".

Though Bantam had envisioned a series of eight books, the publisher halted plans after the first sold less well than expected. Kane maintained that,

Kane also partly blamed Tarzan comic strip writer-artist Burne Hogarth, an influential figure in the field, for the series' demise:

By this time Kane had already completed The Mind Demons, which eventually premiered — with its contents intact but its panel-layout reconfigured — as the 62-page Marvel Comics magazine Marvel Preview #17 (Winter 1979). In an early use of the term, it was called a graphic novel on the cover.

The first Blackmark book had already been reprinted by then — similarly with its contents intact but its panel-layout reconfigured — in Marvel's black-and-white comics-magazine omnibus The Savage Sword of Conan #1-4 (Aug. 1974 - Feb. 1975), as the 15-page "Blackmark" and the 14-page "Blackmark (Chapter 2)", "The Testing of Blackmark", and "Blackmark Triumphant!" The 2002 reissue did not include the original's one-paragraph biography of Kane.

The 30th-anniversary edition includes both the original book and the 117-page sequel  The Mind Demons; an eight-page historical afterword; and the original paperback's double-page frontispiece. It does not include the original final page: a full-body shot of Blackmark with sword, and a Kane floating-head self-portrait and one-paragraph biography / afterword.

Blackmark is unrelated to the music company Black Mark at blackmark.net, or to the fictional insurgent group Blackmark in the TV series Babylon 5.

Plot
Old Earth is dead, devastated by the nuclear holocausts. New Earth lives on as a shadow world, inhabited by the vestiges of humanity, divided into tyrannical petty kingdoms, wracked by fear, superstitions, and barbaric poverty. Strange, fearsome mutated beasts roam the blasted lands and waters, while on the cold northern frontiers, a race of malformed men with strange mental powers plot the eventual conquest of the planet from the fortress of Psi-Keep.

Zeph the Tinker travels with his young wife Marnie from Country Clayro through Country McCall and the Demon Waste. While Zeph is hunting game, Marnie is startled by two riders fleeing pursuers. The riders — the dying wizard-king Amarix and his companion Balzamo — make the barren woman a deal to not only transfer the post-holocaust knowledge in his head to Marnie, but to make it possible for that information to be passed onto her unborn child. 

That child, Blackmark, eventually becomes a gladiator slave.

Awards
The book won its creator, Gil Kane, a Shazam Award for Special Recognition in 1973 "for Blackmark, his paperback comics novel."

Critical assessments
Associate Professor Matt Thorn of the School of Cartoon & Comic Art, Kyoto Seika University, in Japan, said of the 1971 paperback: "[I]t's a great read, beautifully illustrated. ... I found the separation of text and images to be no obstacle, and was soon absorbed in the story and art. And speaking of art, this is truly Kane at his finest. Here I think he approaches his own ideal of portraying 'life in motion'. Melodramatic? Cheesy? Maybe. Blackmark is pulp entertainment at its best".

Critic Randy Lander, in a review of the reissue, said Blackmark "started to push the boundaries of what comics could do. The book does not look particularly revolutionary in 2002, but when you consider that it was created over 30 years ago, this illustrated novel that is a mixture of science-fiction and fantasy genres and is unquestionably aimed at an adult audience, starts to look a lot more impressive. ...Goodwin and Kane take a fairly predictable plot and stock characters and make it a fascinating and twisted ride. ... The material sometimes features cheesy dialogue or veers into melodrama, but mostly it holds up remarkably well. It's hard to argue against the merits of Blackmark. It's a piece of comic-book history, a solidly produced book and an example of work from two of the finest creators to grace the medium".

Comics historian R. C. Harvey notes that "several sequences ... gain enormous power from the juxtaposition of pictures and prose."  Breaking down a four-page scene in which the mother of a six-year-old Blackmark is raped as the child is forced to look on, Harvey observes that,

References

External links
 Blackmark and Blackmark 30th Anniversary Edition at the Grand Comics Database
 Blackmark at the Michigan State University Libraries: Index to the Comic Art Collection. WebCitation archive.
 Horn, Maurice, ed., The World Encyclopedia of Comics (Chelsea House, 1976): Index entry (pp. 287, 419)

1971 graphic novels
American graphic novels
Bantam Books books
Sword and sorcery
Mutants in fiction
Gladiatorial combat in fiction
Works about slavery